Amir Hossein Khodamoradi (born September 13, 2000 in Shahriar) is an Iranian footballer who plays as a midfielder who currently plays for Iranian club Havadar in the Persian Gulf Pro League.

Club career

Esteghlal
He made his debut for Esteghlal in 24th fixtures of 2019–20 Persian Gulf Pro League against Tractor while he substituted in for Farshid Esmaeili.

References

External links 
 

Living people
2000 births
Association football midfielders
Iranian footballers
Esteghlal F.C. players
Havadar S.C. players
People from Tehran Province